Michigan's 38th House of Representatives district (also referred to as Michigan's 38th House district) is a legislative district within the Michigan House of Representatives located in parts of Allegan, Berrien, and Van Buren counties. The district was created in 1965, when the Michigan House of Representatives district naming scheme changed from a county-based system to a numerical one.

History 
The district was an ultra-marginal seat after the 2018 elections, with Representative Crawford winning re-election by just 588 votes.

List of representatives

Recent Elections

Historical district boundaries

References 

Michigan House of Representatives districts
Oakland County, Michigan